RJ TextEd is a freeware Unicode text and source code editor for Windows, that can also be used as a simple web development tool.

The editor uses a variety of techniques for syntax highlighting in the source. It can use auto completion and hints to assist in editing source code. Previews of  HTML/ASP/PHP code are supported. A syntax file editor is included.

The interface is based on the MDI with tabs for editing multiple files and  open document manipulation.

TextEd includes a web browser, a file manager, and a CSS editor, as well as various tools for web developers.

See also
List of text editors
Comparison of text editors

References

External links 
RJ TextEd Homepage
RJ TextEd Forum

Windows-only freeware
Windows text editors
Freeware
Pascal (programming language) software